Tahlia Tupaea (born 1 June 1997) is an Australian-New Zealand professional basketball player.

Professional career

WNBL
Tupaea became the second youngest debutant in WNBL history in October 2012 at age 15 and 133 days. She played eight seasons for the Sydney Uni Flames between 2012 and 2020.

Tupaea played for the Canberra Capitals during the 2020 WNBL hub season in Queensland and then re-joined the team for the 2021–22 WNBL season. She re-signed with the Capitals in May 2022.

WNBA
In April 2017, Tupaea was drafted by the Minnesota Lynx with the 36th and final pick of the 2017 WNBA draft.

Australian State Leagues and New Zealand
In 2013 and 2015, Tupaea played in the Waratah League for the Penrith Panthers. In 2016, she played for the BA Centre of Excellence in the SEABL. She continued in the SEABL in 2017 and 2018 with the Sydney Uni Sparks before joining the USC Rip City in the QBL in 2019. In 2021, she returned to the Waratah League to play for the Bankstown Bruins, winning league MVP.

In 2022, Tupaea joined the Northern Kāhu for the inaugural season of New Zealand's Tauihi Basketball Aotearoa, where she won league MVP.

National team career
Tupaea represented Australia at the 2013 FIBA Oceania U16 Championship, 2013 FIBA U19 World Championship, 2014 FIBA Oceania U18 Championship, 2014 FIBA U17 World Championship, and 2015 FIBA U19 World Championship.

Personal life
Tupaea is a dual citizen of Australia and New Zealand.

References

External links
Basketball Australia profile

1997 births
Living people
Australian women's basketball players
Canberra Capitals players
Guards (basketball)
Minnesota Lynx draft picks
Sydney Uni Flames players
Tauihi Basketball Aotearoa players